Agioi Theodoroi is a village and a community of the Grevena municipality. Before the 2011 local government reform it was a part of the municipality of Grevena, of which it was a municipal district. The 2011 census recorded 215 residents in the village and 369 residents in the community. The community of Agioi Theodoroi covers an area of 152.182 km2.

Administrative division
The community of Agioi Theodoroi consists of four separate settlements: 
Agioi Theodoroi (population 215)
Aimilianos (population 36)
Anthrakia (population 103)
Despotis (population 15)
The aforementioned population figures are as of 2011.

Population
According to the 2011 census, the population of the settlement of Agioi Theodoroi was 215 people, a decrease of almost 20% compared to the previous census of 2001.

See also
 List of settlements in the Grevena regional unit

References

Populated places in Grevena (regional unit)
Villages in Greece